Victor Martin Watson (10 November 1897 – 3 August 1988) was an English professional footballer who played most of his club football for West Ham United.

Playing career
Watson, a centre forward, played 505 times for West Ham between 1920 and 1936. The club paid just £50 for Vic from Wellingborough, bringing him in to provide cover for Syd Puddefoot.

Watson is the club's record goalscorer with 326 goals: 298 in the League and 28 in the FA Cup. 203 of his league goals were from 295 top flight appearances. He once scored six, in an 8–2 home win against Leeds on 9 February 1929, scored four goals on three occasions, and managed 13 hat-tricks while at West Ham.

Watson gained two international caps with England in 1923 and a further three caps in 1930, scoring four goals in total, including two against Scotland in the 1930 British Home Championship.

He spent one season (1935–36) with Southampton before retiring and he was the club's top scorer with 14 goals in 36 league appearances.

Upon retiring, he became a market gardener in Girton, Cambridgeshire. He died in August 1988 at the age of 90.

In June 2010 a plaque honouring Watson was unveiled in Girton.

Honours
West Ham United
 Division Two Runners Up: 1922–23
 FA Cup finalist: 1923

England
British Home Championship: 1930

References

External links
Victor Watson profile at England football online
Vic Watson photos
Profile on Cambridge City website

1897 births
1988 deaths
Military personnel from Cambridgeshire
People from Girton, Cambridgeshire
England international footballers
English footballers
Association football forwards
English Football League players
First Division/Premier League top scorers
Wellingborough Town F.C. players
West Ham United F.C. players
Southampton F.C. players
British Army personnel of World War I
FA Cup Final players
British Army soldiers